Three ships of the French Navy, all submarines, have borne the name Roland Morillot in honour of lieutenant de vaisseau Roland Morillot:
 , a captured German Type UB II submarine
 , a captured German Type XXI submarine

See also
 

French Navy ship names